When True Night Falls, published in 1993 by DAW Books, is a fantasy novel by American writer Celia S. Friedman.  It is the second book in the Coldfire Trilogy.

Plot summary
In When True Night Falls, Damien, Hesseth, and Tarrant land on the shores of the Eastern Continent where the order of the Church have managed to subdue the unconscious working of the Fae. Consequently, the technology of the civilization is far more advanced than the Western Continent as is seen by the casual use of explosive weapons and fireworks. While conversing with various leaders, the group learns that only women are allowed to rise to the highest ranks in the Eastern Church. Many rarely see the Matria or holy women of the Church except for odd snippets of time and it is discovered by the group that the Matria and holy women are in fact rakh disguised with tidal fae.

After learning of the corruption starting on the Eastern Continent the group  manage to trace it south, to the crystal palace of the Immortal Prince, and his Iezu servant, Calesta.  Along the way, they rescue a young girl, Jenseny, whose father was killed and impersonated by the Prince's rakh servants. Jenseny is driven near to madness by events she has seen and her rare ability to see and control tidal fae. While scared and untrustful she manages to form a bond with Hesseth who is unable to bear children as was ritual to the rakh who journey away from their homes to mingle with humans.

The Prince makes a deal with Tarrant; in return for immortality, the Hunter must lead Hesseth, Damien, and Jenseny into a trap. But there was one catch to the deal: the Immortal Prince's plans include the corruption of the Church, and the former Prophet is not willing to accept that.

Meanwhile, Damien, Hesseth and Jenseny cross a seemingly endless desert populated with scraggly white trees and skeletons. Damien is hesitant to cross the desert as the skeletons indicate some form of predator but sees nothing that could possibly pose a true threat. The group decides to cross and settle down for the night under a tree. Damien and Hesseth awaken to find that the tree's roots have begun to grow into their bodies. While at first they cannot move, they both eventually break free of the trees and find that Jenseny's body has also been invaded by the roots.  Damien cut away the roots but feared that they might still be harmful to the young girl.  The trio keeps traveling without rest to avoid the roots of the trees.  They finally find rest on a granite outcropping.  That evening when Gerald returns, he kills the roots of the tree that are still inside Jenseny.  Damien then Heals the wounds that are left when Gerald is finished.

Soon afterwards the group notice that there are large quadrupeds headed towards them with the intent purpose of killing them. In the escape that follows, Hesseth willingly gives up her life to save Jenseny - feeling that Jenseny was much akin to a child of her own and thereby willing to possess the greatest honor in sacrifice.

Tarrant joins the group at nightfall and leads Damien and Jenseny into the trap in the Prince's lands but finds a way to smuggle a coldfire-worked knife into Damien's hands. Damien attempts to kill the Prince, but the Prince's soul jumps into the body of his rakh captain.  Jenseny finds the coldfire knife, and, hiding it, makes a deal with the Immortal Prince: he can have her body, and with it, her ability to work the tidal fae, a newly evolved human trait.  The Prince agrees, but just as he is entering her body, Jenseny weaves a bond between herself and the Prince, and sacrifices herself to kill the Prince.

Following the Prince's death, Damien and Gerald Tarrant return north where civil unrest has broken out due to the revealing of the corruption in the Church. The new leader of the Church plans to purge the Eastern Continent which in turn infuriates Tarrant as that was not Tarrant's conception of the Church. However, in Tarrant's confrontation with the new leader, Tarrant accidentally shares a "divining" of the possible fall of the Church thereby bringing the new leader to his senses and stopping the slaughter of thousands of innocent lives. By doing so, Tarrant breaks his oath to the Unnamed and endangers his life in the process - a fact Calesta is quick to catch on to.

Publication details
 1993, United States, DAW Books , Pub date 1 October 1993, Hardcover reissue
 1994, United States, DAW Books , Pub date 1 September 1994, Paperback reissue
 2005, United States, DAW Trade , Pub date 4 October 2005, Paperback reprint

1993 American novels
American fantasy novels
DAW Books books
Books with cover art by Michael Whelan